Camilo Andrés Morán Bahamondes (born 17 April 1990) is a Chilean politician.

External links
 BCN Profile

1990 births
Living people
21st-century Chilean politicians
Bolivarian University of Chile alumni
National Renewal (Chile) politicians
Members of the Chamber of Deputies of Chile
People from Santiago Province, Chile